Type 081 mine countermeasure vessel (NATO reporting name Wochi-class) is a Chinese minesweeper/minehunter currently in service with the People's Liberation Army Navy (PLAN). The second batch is often designated as Type 081A.

Type 081
Type 081 was built by Qiuxin (求新) Shipyard of Jiangnan Shipyard in Shanghai. The first ship was launched in 2006 and entered service in 2007. Specification:
Displacement: 996 tons
Length: 
Armament: 1 Type 76 twin 37 mm naval gun (Type 76F)

Type 081A
Originally only known as the second batch of Type 081, it was revealed that this new minesweeper was designated as Type 081A, and it is a development of earlier Type 081. Type 081A is designed by the 708th Institute. A total of five have entered service with PLAN by mid-2014. Specification:
Displacement: 1200 tons
Length: 
Armament: 1 H/PJ-14 single 30 mm naval gun

References

Minesweepers of the People's Liberation Army Navy